Serge Chapleau (born December 5, 1945) is a Canadian political cartoonist from the province of Quebec.

Biography 
Born in Montreal, Quebec, the youngest in a family of seven children, Serge Chapleau grew up in a blue collar neighbourhood in Montréal, where his childhood kingdom was the back alley of rue Drolet. After studying painting and graphic art at the School of Fine Arts in Montreal, Chapleau created in 1971 a caricature of the songbook Gilles Vigneault for Perspectives, a weekly paper distributed with the Saturday Editions of several Quebec dailys.

During the following years, Chapleau collaborated in several other publications, such as Montréal-Matin, Week-End, Actualité and Nous.  Following Le Devoir in 1985, he worked at Le Matin in 1987, and 7 Jours from 1989 to 1992.  After a return to Le Devoir in 1991, he became in 1996 a cartoonist at La Presse, a post that he continues to occupy.

From 2004 to 2019, his puppet character Gérard D. Laflaque, returned to television in CGI form  on Et Dieu créa Laflaque. He and fellow Montreal cartoonist Terry Mosher were the subject of a 2003 documentary film, Nothing Scared, directed by Garry Beitel. Chapleau suffers from Dupuytren's contracture, a hand disease in which the formation of scar tissue under the skin of the palm causes fingers to curl inward and lose the motion of the tendons' ability to grip.

Honours and publications 
For more than two decades Serge Chapleau has been a finalist at the National Newspaper Awards of the Canadian Association of Newspapers in the Editorial Cartooning category; to date he has won the award on seven separate occasions.

Since 1993, Éditions du Boréal has published an annual collection of his best caricatures, L'année Chapleau.

From May 22, 1997, to September 20, 1998, the Musée McCord presented an exhibit on the works of Chapleau Aislin, Aislin & Chapleau Caricatures.

He was named a Member of the Order of Canada in 2015.

References

External links
 McCord Museum — Aislin & Chapleau Caricatures
Funny and Moody : The Best of Chapleau's Cartoons

1945 births
Artists from Montreal
Canadian editorial cartoonists
Canadian caricaturists
French Quebecers
Living people
Members of the Order of Canada